The most famous and known are those of La Mancha, thanks to medieval novel Don Quixote.

This is an incomplete list of windmills in Spain. you can help expanding the article.

Aragon

Province of Huesca

Andalusia

Province of Almería

Province of Cádiz

Province of Córdoba

Province of Huelva

Province of Jaén

Balearic Islands

Basque Country

Biscay

Cantabria

Castile-La Mancha

Province of Ciudad Real

Province of Cuenca

Province of Toledo

Catalonia

Province of Lleida

Province of Tarragona

Canary Islands

Murcia

Valencian Community

Province of Castellón

Province of Valencia

References

Agricultural buildings in Spain
 
Windmills
Spain